Guitarra may refer to:
Gittern, a medieval string instrument
Guitarra Portuguesa, a traditional Portuguese string instrument used in Fado music